Dvalishvili is a Georgian surname. Notable people with the surname include:
Nadezhda Khnykina-Dvalishvili (born 1933), Soviet track and field athlete
Vladimir Dvalishvili (born 1986), Georgian football player

Surnames of Georgian origin
Georgian-language surnames